Alphonse de Polignac (1826–1863) was a French mathematician. In 1849, the year he was admitted to Polytechnique, he made what's known as Polignac's conjecture:

For every positive integer k, there are infinitely many prime gaps of size 2k.

The case k = 1 is the twin prime conjecture.

He also conjectured Romanov's theorem.

His father, Jules de Polignac (1780-1847) was prime minister of Charles X until the Bourbon dynasty was overthrown (1830).

See also
de Polignac's formula
Polignac family

References

1826 births
1863 deaths
19th-century French mathematicians